The Human Rights Party (HRP) was a left-wing political party that existed in Michigan during the early and mid-1970s. The party achieved electoral success in Ann Arbor and Ypsilanti. It eventually expanded to include several other Michigan cities with large student populations. In 1975, the HRP became the Socialist Human Rights Party, and it later merged with the Socialist Party of Michigan.

Origins of the HRP
The organization was established in 1970 under the leadership of Zolton Ferency, and it quickly gained strength following the 1971 ratification of the Twenty-sixth Amendment to the Constitution, which gave 18-year-olds the right to vote. In October 1971, the Radical Independent Party of Ann Arbor, Michigan (RIP), which had been formed by members of the Students for a Democratic Society, New University Conference, and International Socialists, merged with the HRP. The Human Rights Party’s platform included calls for the immediate withdrawal of all U.S. military forces from foreign soil, the end of the ROTC and Selective Service, repeal of laws against homosexuality and prostitution, the closure of all state prisons, and provision of day care and health care based on ability to pay.

Working to gain electoral votes among the city's large population of students at the University of Michigan, the HRP succeeded in electing two candidates to the Ann Arbor city council in 1972, and successfully defended one of the seats in 1974. Building support through rock concerts, local radio spots, and coverage in the underground press, the HRP won 25 percent of the 30,000 ballots cast in the 1972 Ann Arbor municipal election. The party's victors in the city-council races – Jerry DeGrieck, a history student at the University of Michigan, and Nancy Wechsler, a U-M graduate, both 22 years of age – defeated two professors, both of whom were Democrats, and one of whom was an incumbent member of the City Council. As DeGrieck later noted, the party garnered substantial support not only from students, but also from low-income voters and factory workers. In two other Ann Arbor wards, reported the New York Times, "the Human Rights Party drew off enough votes from the Democratic candidates to help conservative Republicans win." In the next-door city of Ypsilanti, the HRP elected two city council members in 1974, both of whom were re-elected in 1976.

During the 1972 election, the HRP chose a fifteen-year-old Sonia Yaco, an activist affiliated with Youth Liberation of Ann Arbor, as its Ann Arbor school-board candidate. Yaco's demands for a student voice in school governance earned her 1,300 votes as a write-in candidate, or eight percent of the total, and indirectly influenced the establishment of the experimental alternative Community High School later that year. One of the first HRP candidates was Lawrence ("Larry") Pallozola, who unsuccessfully ran for school board in Garden City, Michigan, in the early 1970s.

The HRP in government

Ann Arbor City Council
From April 1972 to April 1973, the two Human Rights representatives were able to significantly influence the decisions of the Ann Arbor city council, since no political party held a majority.  In addition to the HRP members, there were five Republicans and four Democrats. During their time on city council, HRP members successfully pushed for a number of progressive ordinances, including the city's famously lenient "five-dollar pot law," which had the effect of decriminalizing the possession of small amounts of marijuana for personal use (see Cannabis laws in Ann Arbor, Michigan). In addition, the HRP led a push for a citywide anti-discrimination ordinance, which banned discrimination based on race, national origin, sex, age, and religion. The ordinance was the first of its kind in Michigan. In 1972, the pioneering ordinance was amended to add sexual orientation, and to require affirmative-action measures by city contractors.

On zoning issues, the party worked to restrict the construction of fast-food chains in the city's downtown area. Alongside its electoral work, the HRP put on a number of protests, supported area workers' strikes, organized city tenants, and aided the anti-war movement. As Nancy Wechsler told the Wall Street Journal, the HRP also fought successfully to set aside federal revenue-sharing dollars for health and child care at a time when "most cities are spending revenue-sharing money for more police cars."

At a joint press conference following a homophobic incident at a local restaurant, both of the 1972 HRP winners, Nancy Wechsler and Jerry DeGrieck, came out as gay and lesbian during their term on city council - thus simultaneously becoming the first openly lesbian and openly gay elected public officials in the United States. When Wechsler declined to run for reelection in 1974, her seat was won by HRP candidate Kathy Kozachenko.  Already publicly known to be a lesbian, she thus became the first openly gay or lesbian candidate to be elected to public office in the United States.

Ypsilanti City Council

In 1974 the HRP activists in Ypsilanti helped to pass the Ypsilanti Marijuana Initiative, a $5 fine for marijuana use or possession. In the same election, the HRP elected council members Eric Jackson and Harold Baize to their first term of office. Jackson and Baize championed anti-discrimination, fair rental practices, women's rights, and environmental issues. When Ypsilanti police ignored the voter's mandate by enforcing State marijuana laws rather than the Ypsilanti Marijuana Initiative, Jackson and Baize called for an emergency meeting of the city council to deal with the issue. Although most of the other members of the city council boycotted the meeting, hundreds of citizens did not, resulting in a near riot.

Human Rights Party city council members Eric Jackson and Harold Baize were re-elected in 1976 and continued their struggles for progressive policies. Following the loss of ballot status for the Michigan HRP, Harold Baize was elected to a third term as a Democrat in 1978. The Ypsilanti HRP changed its name to the Democratic Socialist Caucus and elected other members to the city council as well as electing Peter Murdock as mayor. At one point, the DSC controlled nine of the eleven city council seats as well as the mayor's position.  It ceased to exist in 1986.

The HRP and instant-runoff voting in Ann Arbor
With the introduction of a strong third party in Ann Arbor, concerns grew among Democrats and HRP supporters that the city's progressive vote would be split, thus allowing Republicans to win offices on pluralities. This scenario came to pass soon after the emergence of the HRP. In 1973 Republican James E. Stephenson won the mayoral office with a plurality, defeating Democratic candidate Franz J. Mogdis and HRP candidate Benita Kaimowitz despite garnering only 47% of the vote. To head off a repeat of this result, the HRP spearheaded a petition campaign to place the Instant-runoff voting (IRV) system on the city ballot in spring of 1974. Most Democratic and HRP voters supported the proposal, which passed with 52% approval.

In April 1975, during the first (and only) Ann Arbor mayoral race using IRV, the Republican incumbent James E. Stephenson received 49% of the first-choice ballots, leading his Democratic challenger Al Wheeler, who received 40%, and the HRP candidate Carol Ernst with 11%. However, since most HRP voters had ranked Wheeler as their second choice, these votes moved to the Democrat's column, and Wheeler won the election by a slim 121 votes, becoming the city's first African American mayor. The election represented the first use of IRV in a U.S. mayoral contest.

The IRV system survived a court challenge by Republicans, but Ann Arbor voters repealed the system in an April 1976 special election. The IRV system was not again used in a United States election until San Francisco began using a similar system in 2004.

End of the HRP
With the nationwide decline in student activism, the Human Rights Party's power waned in the mid-1970s. In 1973, Ann Arbor's Democratic/HRP governing coalition lost power, as Republican James E. Stephenson won the mayoralty and Republicans also took control of seven of the ten council seats.

The Ann Arbor chapter lost its last remaining city-council seat in 1976. In 1975, the HRP became the Socialist Human Rights Party, and it later merged with the Socialist Party of Michigan. Some members joined the Democratic Party. However, several of its landmark initiatives, notably the Ann Arbor anti-discrimination ordinance and the lenient municipal marijuana penalties, survive in modified form to this day.

See also
Cannabis in the United States

References

Further reading
 Agis Salpukas, "2 Radicals Elected to Ann Arbor Seats," New York Times, 9 April 1972.

External links
 Archived HRP papers at the University of Michigan
 MA Thesis by Terrence Restivo on the New Left in Ann Arbor, MI
 Short biography of former HRP council member Nancy Wechsler, from the Women's Review of Books website at Wellesley College.
 

Ypsilanti, Michigan
Regional and state political parties in the United States
Political parties established in 1970
Defunct democratic socialist parties in the United States
Defunct social democratic parties in the United States
Organizations based in Ann Arbor, Michigan
1970 establishments in Michigan
1975 disestablishments in Michigan
Political parties disestablished in 1975